Names of the victims of the September 11 attacks were inscribed at the National September 11 Memorial & Museum alphabetically by last name initial. They are organized as such:
List of victims of the September 11 attacks (A–G)
List of victims of the September 11 attacks (H–N)
List of victims of the September 11 attacks (O–Z)

September 11 attacks